A lysosome is a membrane-bound organelle found in many animal cells. They are spherical vesicles that contain hydrolytic enzymes that can break down many kinds of biomolecules. A lysosome has a specific composition, of both its membrane proteins, and its lumenal proteins.  The lumen's pH (~4.5–5.0) is optimal for the enzymes involved in hydrolysis, analogous to the activity of the stomach. Besides degradation of polymers, the lysosome is involved in various cell processes, including secretion, plasma membrane repair, apoptosis, cell signaling, and energy metabolism.

Lysosomes are termed to be degradative organelles that act as the waste disposal system of the cell by digesting used materials in the cytoplasm, from both inside and outside the cell. Material from outside the cell is taken up through endocytosis, while material from the inside of the cell is digested through autophagy. The sizes of the organelles vary greatly—the larger ones can be more than 10 times the size of the smaller ones. They were discovered and named by Belgian biologist Christian de Duve, who eventually received the Nobel Prize in Physiology or Medicine in 1974.

Lysosomes are known to contain more than 60 different enzymes, and have more than 50 membrane proteins. Enzymes of the lysosomes are synthesized in the rough endoplasmic reticulum and exported to the Golgi apparatus upon recruitment by a complex composed of CLN6 and CLN8 proteins. The enzymes are trafficked from the Golgi apparatus to lysosomes in small vesicles, which fuse with larger acidic vesicles. Enzymes destined for a lysosome are specifically tagged with the molecule mannose 6-phosphate, so that they are properly sorted into acidified vesicles.

In 2009, Marco Sardiello and co-workers discovered that the synthesis of most lysosomal enzymes and membrane proteins is controlled by transcription factor EB (TFEB), which promotes the transcription of nuclear genes. Mutations in the genes for these enzymes are responsible for more than 50 different human genetic disorders, which are collectively known as lysosomal storage diseases. These diseases result from an accumulation of specific substrates, due to the inability to break them down. These genetic defects are related to several neurodegenerative disorders, cancers, cardiovascular diseases, and aging-related diseases.

Etymology and pronunciation
The word lysosome is New Latin that uses the combining forms lyso- (referring to lysis and derived from the Latin lysis, meaning "to loosen", via Ancient Greek λύσις [lúsis]), and -some, from soma, "body", yielding "body that lyses" or "lytic body". The adjectival form is lysosomal. The forms *lyosome and *lyosomal are much rarer; they use the lyo- form of the prefix but are often treated by readers and editors as mere unthinking replications of typos, which has no doubt been true as often as not.

Discovery

Christian de Duve, at the Laboratory of Physiological Chemistry at the Catholic University of Louvain in Belgium, had been studying the mechanism of action of insulin in liver cells. By 1949, he and his team had focused on the enzyme called glucose 6-phosphatase, which is the first crucial enzyme in sugar metabolism and the target of insulin. They already suspected that this enzyme played a key role in regulating blood sugar levels. However, even after a series of experiments, they failed to purify and isolate the enzyme from the cellular extracts. Therefore, they tried a more arduous procedure of cell fractionation, by which cellular components are separated based on their sizes using centrifugation.

They succeeded in detecting the enzyme activity from the microsomal fraction. This was the crucial step in the serendipitous discovery of lysosomes. To estimate this enzyme activity, they used that of the standardized enzyme acid phosphatase and found that the activity was only 10% of the expected value. One day, the enzyme activity of purified cell fractions which had been refrigerated for five days was measured. Surprisingly, the enzyme activity was increased to normal of that of the fresh sample. The result was the same no matter how many times they repeated the estimation, and led to the conclusion that a membrane-like barrier limited the accessibility of the enzyme to its substrate, and that the enzymes were able to diffuse after a few days (and react with their substrate). They described this membrane-like barrier as a "saclike structure surrounded by a membrane and containing acid phosphatase."

It became clear that this enzyme from the cell fraction came from membranous fractions, which were definitely cell organelles, and in 1955 De Duve named them "lysosomes" to reflect their digestive properties. The same year, Alex B. Novikoff from the University of Vermont visited de Duve's laboratory, and successfully obtained the first electron micrographs of the new organelle. Using a staining method for acid phosphatase, de Duve and Novikoff confirmed the location of the hydrolytic enzymes of lysosomes using light and electron microscopic studies. de Duve won the Nobel Prize in Physiology or Medicine in 1974 for this discovery.

Originally, De Duve had termed the organelles the "suicide bags" or "suicide sacs" of the cells, for their hypothesized role in apoptosis. However, it has since been concluded that they only play a minor role in cell death.

Function and structure 

Lysosomes contain a variety of enzymes, enabling the cell to break down various biomolecules it engulfs, including peptides, nucleic acids, carbohydrates, and lipids (lysosomal lipase). The enzymes responsible for this hydrolysis require an acidic environment for optimal activity.

In addition to being able to break down polymers, lysosomes are capable of fusing with other organelles & digesting large structures or cellular debris; through cooperation with phagosomes, they are able to conduct autophagy, clearing out damaged structures. Similarly, they are able to break down virus particles or bacteria in phagocytosis of macrophages.

The size of lysosomes varies from 0.1 μm to 1.2 μm. With a pH ranging from ~4.5–5.0, the interior of the lysosomes is acidic compared to the slightly basic cytosol (pH 7.2).  The lysosomal membrane protects the cytosol, and therefore the rest of the cell, from the degradative enzymes within the lysosome. The cell is additionally protected from any lysosomal acid hydrolases that drain into the cytosol, as these enzymes are pH-sensitive and do not function well or at all in the alkaline environment of the cytosol. This ensures that cytosolic molecules and organelles are not destroyed in case there is leakage of the hydrolytic enzymes from the lysosome.

The lysosome maintains its pH differential by pumping in protons (H+ ions) from the cytosol across the membrane via proton pumps and chloride ion channels. Vacuolar-ATPases are responsible for transport of protons, while the counter transport of chloride ions is performed by ClC-7 Cl−/H+ antiporter. In this way a steady acidic environment is maintained.

It sources its versatile capacity for degradation by import of enzymes with specificity for different substrates; cathepsins are the major class of hydrolytic enzymes, while lysosomal alpha-glucosidase is responsible for carbohydrates, and lysosomal acid phosphatase is necessary to release phosphate groups of phospholipids.

Recent research also indicates that lysosomes can act as a source of intracellular calcium.

Formation 

Many components of animal cells are recycled by transferring them inside or embedded in sections of membrane. For instance, in endocytosis (more specifically, macropinocytosis), a portion of the cell's plasma membrane pinches off to form vesicles that will eventually fuse with an organelle within the cell. Without active replenishment, the plasma membrane would continuously decrease in size. It is thought that lysosomes participate in this dynamic membrane exchange system and are formed by a gradual maturation process from endosomes.

The production of lysosomal proteins suggests one method of lysosome sustainment. Lysosomal protein genes are transcribed in the nucleus in a process that is controlled by transcription factor EB (TFEB). mRNA transcripts exit the nucleus into the cytosol, where they are translated by ribosomes. The nascent peptide chains are translocated into the rough endoplasmic reticulum, where they are modified. Lysosomal soluble proteins exit the endoplasmic reticulum via COPII-coated vesicles after recruitment by the EGRESS complex (ER-to-Golgi relaying of enzymes of the lysosomal system), which is composed of CLN6 and CLN8 proteins. COPII vesicles then deliver lysosomal enzymes to the Golgi apparatus, where a specific lysosomal tag, mannose 6-phosphate, is added to the peptides. The presence of these tags allow for binding to mannose 6-phosphate receptors in the Golgi apparatus, a phenomenon that is crucial for proper packaging into vesicles destined for the lysosomal system.

Upon leaving the Golgi apparatus, the lysosomal enzyme-filled vesicle fuses with a late endosome, a relatively acidic organelle with an approximate pH of 5.5. This acidic environment causes dissociation of the lysosomal enzymes from the mannose 6-phosphate receptors. The enzymes are packed into vesicles for further transport to established lysosomes. The late endosome itself can eventually grow into a mature lysosome, as evidenced by the transport of endosomal membrane components from the lysosomes back to the endosomes.

Pathogen entry 
As the endpoint of endocytosis, the lysosome also acts as a safeguard in preventing pathogens from being able to reach the cytoplasm before being degraded. Pathogens often hijack endocytotic pathways such as pinocytosis in order to gain entry into the cell. The lysosome prevents easy entry into the cell by hydrolyzing the biomolecules of pathogens necessary for their replication strategies; reduced Lysosomal activity results in an increase in viral infectivity, including HIV. In addition, AB5 toxins such as cholera hijack the endosomal pathway while evading lysosomal degradation.

Clinical significance

Lysosomes are involved in a group of genetically inherited deficiencies, or mutations called lysosomal storage diseases (LSD), inborn errors of metabolism caused by a dysfunction of one of the enzymes. The rate of incidence is estimated to be 1 in 5,000 births, and the true figure expected to be higher as many cases are likely to be undiagnosed or misdiagnosed. The primary cause is deficiency of an acid hydrolase. Other conditions are due to defects in lysosomal membrane proteins that fail to transport the enzyme, non-enzymatic soluble lysosomal proteins. The initial effect of such disorders is accumulation of specific macromolecules or monomeric compounds inside the endosomal–autophagic–lysosomal system. This results in abnormal signaling pathways, calcium homeostasis, lipid biosynthesis and degradation and intracellular trafficking, ultimately leading to pathogenetic disorders. The organs most affected are brain, viscera, bone and cartilage.

There is no direct medical treatment to cure LSDs. The most common LSD is Gaucher's disease, which is due to deficiency of the enzyme glucocerebrosidase. Consequently, the enzyme substrate, the fatty acid glucosylceramide accumulates, particularly in white blood cells, which in turn affects spleen, liver, kidneys, lungs, brain and bone marrow. The disease is characterized by bruises, fatigue, anaemia, low blood platelets, osteoporosis, and enlargement of the liver and spleen. As of 2017, enzyme replacement therapy is available for treating 8 of the 50-60 known LDs.

The most severe and rarely found, lysosomal storage disease is inclusion cell disease.

Metachromatic leukodystrophy is another lysosomal storage disease that also affects sphingolipid metabolism.

Dysfunctional lysosome activity is also heavily implicated in the biology of aging, and age-related diseases such as Alzheimer's, Parkinson's, and cardiovascular disease.

Different enzymes present in Lysosomes

Lysosomotropism

Weak bases with lipophilic properties accumulate in acidic intracellular compartments like lysosomes. While the plasma and lysosomal membranes are permeable for neutral and uncharged species of weak bases, the charged protonated species of weak bases do not permeate biomembranes and accumulate within lysosomes. The concentration within lysosomes may reach levels 100 to 1000 fold higher than extracellular concentrations. This phenomenon is called lysosomotropism, "acid trapping" or "proton pump" effect. The amount of accumulation of lysosomotropic compounds may be estimated using a cell-based mathematical model.

A significant part of the clinically approved drugs are lipophilic weak bases with lysosomotropic properties. This explains a number of pharmacological properties of these drugs, such as high tissue-to-blood concentration gradients or long tissue elimination half-lives; these properties have been found for drugs such as haloperidol, levomepromazine, and amantadine. However, high tissue concentrations and long elimination half-lives are explained also by lipophilicity and absorption of drugs to fatty tissue structures. Important lysosomal enzymes, such as acid sphingomyelinase, may be inhibited by lysosomally accumulated drugs. Such compounds are termed FIASMAs (functional inhibitor of acid sphingomyelinase) and include for example fluoxetine, sertraline, or amitriptyline.

Ambroxol is a lysosomotropic drug of clinical use to treat conditions of productive cough for its mucolytic action. Ambroxol triggers the exocytosis of lysosomes via neutralization of lysosomal pH and calcium release from acidic calcium stores. Presumably for this reason, Ambroxol was also found to improve cellular function in some disease of lysosomal origin such as Parkinson's or lysosomal storage disease.

Systemic lupus erythematosus 
Impaired lysosome function is prominent in systemic lupus erythematosus preventing macrophages and monocytes from degrading neutrophil extracellular traps and immune complexes. The failure to degrade internalized immune complexes stems from chronic mTORC2 activity, which impairs lysosome acidification. As a result, immune complexes in the lysosome recycle to the surface of macrophages causing an accumulation of nuclear antigens upstream of multiple lupus-associated pathologies.

Controversy in botany 

By scientific convention, the term lysosome is applied to these vesicular organelles only in animals, and the term vacuole is applied to those in plants, fungi and algae (some animal cells also have vacuoles). Discoveries in plant cells since the 1970s started to challenge this definition. Plant vacuoles are found to be much more diverse in structure and function than previously thought. Some vacuoles contain their own hydrolytic enzymes and perform the classic lysosomal activity, which is autophagy. These vacuoles are therefore seen as fulfilling the role of the animal lysosome. Based on de Duve's description that "only when considered as part of a system involved directly or indirectly in intracellular digestion does the term lysosome describe a physiological unit", some botanists strongly argued that these vacuoles are lysosomes. However, this is not universally accepted as the vacuoles are strictly not similar to lysosomes, such as in their specific enzymes and lack of phagocytic functions. Vacuoles do not have catabolic activity and do not undergo exocytosis as lysosomes do.

See also 
 Peroxisome
 Cathelicidin
 Antimicrobial peptides
 Innate immune system
 TMEM106B

References

External links 

 
 3D structures of proteins associated with lysosome membrane
 Hide and Seek Foundation For Lysosomal Research
Lysosomal Disease Network, a research consortium funded by the NIH through its NCATS/Rare Diseases Clinical Research Network
 Self-Destructive Behavior in Cells May Hold Key to a Longer Life
 Mutations in the Lysosomal Enzyme–Targeting Pathway and Persistent Stuttering
 Animation showing how lysosomes are made, and their function

Vesicles
Cell anatomy
Organelles
Lysosomal storage diseases